A paperbark tree usually refers to one of many species of trees in the Melaleuca genus, mostly found in Australia.

Paperbark, paper bark or paper-bark may also refer to:

Other trees
Paperbark acacia, or Vachellia sieberiana, a tree native to southern Africa
Paperbark cherry, or Prunus serrula, found in China
Paperbark gum, or Eucalyptus chartaboma, a species of gum tree found in Queensland, Australia
Paperbark maple, or Acer griseum, a type of maple found in China
Paperbark satinash, or Syzygium papyraceum, a Queensland rainforest tree
Paperbark or saltwater paperbark, or Melaleuca cuticularis, a tree found in Western Australia and South Australia
Paperbark or tea tree paperbark or broad-leaved paperbark, or Melaleuca quinquenervia, a tree found on the eastern seaboard of Australia, New Caledonia and Papua New Guinea.

Other uses
Paper Bark Press, an independent publisher of poetry in Australia, 1986 to 2002
Paperbark (video game), an Australian video game, released in 2018
Paperbark flycatcher, a bird

See also
Kungarakany, an Aboriginal Australian people who were named "Paperbark People" by Europeans